The Country Boy: A Play in Three Acts is a play by Irish playwright, John Murphy (1924–1998).  Himself a country boy and native of Charlestown, County Mayo who emigrated to the United States of America, The Country Boy reflects on the social problems of emigration and rural life in the late 1950s.

The Country Boy is a comedy-drama set in the small Irish farmhouse of the Maher family, inhabitants of County Mayo.  It tells the story of Curly, 25, who still lives at home with his parents, Tom and Mary Kate.  But Curly dreams of following his older brother Eddie to the U.S. in pursuit of success, even if it means leaving his sweetheart, Eileen Tierney.  Only upon Eddie's first return home (with wife, Julia) on vacation, are truths revealed of hardship, alcoholism, a troubled marriage, homesickness, and regrets.

John Murphy died in May 1998 and was buried on the slopes of Nephin Mountain in Co. Mayo, a place the character of Tom Maher made reference to in the play. He was laid to rest as Eileen's song, "Down By the Salley Gardens," was sung by the graveside.

Production
The Ulster Group Theatre company performed the first production of The Country Boy in April 1959 at the Group Theatre in Belfast.

Awards
 Amateur Drama Council of Ireland
 1960 - All-Ireland Drama Festival

See also
 Brian Friel's Philadelphia, Here I Come!

References

1959 plays
Irish plays